The following television stations broadcast on digital channel 17 in the United States:

 K17BA-D in Yreka, California
 K17BN-D in Needles, California
 K17BV-D in Redwood Falls, Minnesota, on virtual channel 41, which rebroadcasts KPXM-TV
 K17CA-D in Carson City, Nevada
 K17CL-D in Pahrump, Nevada
 K17DA-D in Lake Havasu City, Arizona
 K17DF-D in Crowley Lake, California
 K17DG-D in Rural Summit County, Utah, on virtual channel 11, which rebroadcasts KBYU-TV
 K17DL-D in Branson, Missouri
 K17DM-D in Myton, Utah
 K17DS-D in Clarendon, Texas
 K17DT-D in Elko, Nevada
 K17DU-D in Christmas Valley, Oregon
 K17ED-D in Payette, Idaho
 K17EU-D in Holyoke, Colorado, on virtual channel 47, which rebroadcasts K21NZ-D
 K17EV-D in Omak, Washington
 K17EZ-D in Rogue River, Oregon
 K17FA-D in Willmar, Minnesota, on virtual channel 11, which rebroadcasts KARE
 K17FE-D in Wadena, Minnesota, on virtual channel 42, which rebroadcasts KSAX
 K17FK-D in Montoya & Newkirk, New Mexico
 K17FR-D in Walker Lake, Nevada
 K17GD-D in Paso Robles, California
 K17GE-D in Dove Creek, etc., Colorado, on virtual channel 17, which rebroadcasts K17JJ-D
 K17GJ-D in Twentynine Palms, California
 K17GK-D in Arlington, Oregon
 K17GV-D in Rainier, Oregon, on virtual channel 12, which rebroadcasts KPTV
 K17HA-D in Astoria, Oregon, on virtual channel 8, which rebroadcasts KGW
 K17HB-D in Winnemucca, Nevada
 K17HE-D in Susanville, etc., California
 K17HI-D in Amarillo, Texas
 K17HQ-D in Hatch, Utah
 K17HW-D in Green River, Utah
 K17HX-D in Minersville, Utah
 K17HY-D in Ridgecrest, etc., California, on virtual channel 34, which rebroadcasts KMEX-DT
 K17ID-D in Cherokee & Alva, Oklahoma
 K17IE-D in Navajo Mountain School, Utah
 K17IF-D in Oljeto, Utah
 K17IG-D in Hoehne, Colorado
 K17IH-D in Montezuma Creek-Anet, Utah
 K17II-D in Logan, Utah, on virtual channel 10, which rebroadcasts KULX-CD
 K17IL-D in Ellensburg, etc., Washington
 K17IP-D in Huntsville, etc., Utah, on virtual channel 4, which rebroadcasts KTVX
 K17JA-D in Basalt, Colorado
 K17JC-D in Orderville, Utah
 K17JD-D in Mount Pleasant, Utah, on virtual channel 30, which rebroadcasts KUCW
 K17JE-D in Mayfield, Utah
 K17JF-D in Bluff, etc., Utah
 K17JH-D in Mexican Hat, etc., Utah
 K17JI-D in Fresno, California
 K17JJ-D in Cortez, Colorado
 K17JK-D in Cane Beds, Arizona/Hildale, Utah
 K17JN-D in Enid, Oklahoma
 K17JP-D in Big Timber, etc., Montana
 K17JS-D in Philipsburg, Montana
 K17JW-D in Romeo, Colorado
 K17JZ-D in Bondurant, Wyoming
 K17KB-D in Belgrade, etc., Montana
 K17KC-D in Meeteetse, Wyoming
 K17KF-D in Cambridge, Idaho
 K17KR-D in Winthrop, Washington
 K17KU-D in Saco, Montana
 K17KW-D in Gettysburg, South Dakota
 K17KX-D in Anton, Colorado, on virtual channel 4, which rebroadcasts KCNC-TV
 K17KZ-D in Harlowton, etc., Montana
 K17LM-D in Yuma, Arizona
 K17LP-D in Fruitland, New Mexico
 K17LV-D in Paragould, Arkansas, on virtual channel 8, which rebroadcasts KAIT
 K17MB-D in Circleville, Utah
 K17MH-D in Cedar Falls, Iowa
 K17MI-D in Eads, etc., Colorado
 K17MJ-D in San Antonio, Texas
 K17MK-D in Elk City, Oklahoma
 K17ML-D in Red River, New Mexico
 K17MN-D in Carlsbad, New Mexico
 K17MO-D in Flagstaff, Arizona, on virtual channel 5, which rebroadcasts KPHO-TV
 K17MP-D in Midland, Texas
 K17MQ-D in Thompson Falls, Montana
 K17MS-D in Poplar, Montana
 K17MT-D in Garfield, etc., Utah
 K17MU-D in Rural Sevier County, Utah
 K17MV-D in Richfield, etc., Utah, on virtual channel 9, which rebroadcasts KUEN
 K17MW-D in St. James, Minnesota
 K17MX-D in Frost, Minnesota
 K17MY-D in Jackson, Minnesota
 K17MZ-D in Torrey, Utah
 K17NA-D in Panguitch, Utah
 K17NB-D in Henrieville, Utah
 K17ND-D in Koosharem, Utah
 K17NE-D in Arlee, Montana
 K17NF-D in Brookings, South Dakota
 K17NG-D in Sage Junction, Wyoming
 K17NH-D in Sterling, Colorado, on virtual channel 7, which rebroadcasts KMGH-TV
 K17NI-D in Mesa, Colorado
 K17NJ-D in Rockaway Beach, Oregon, on virtual channel 8, which rebroadcasts KGW
 K17NK-D in Cedar City, Utah, on virtual channel 5, which rebroadcasts KSL-TV
 K17NL-D in Enterprise, Utah
 K17NM-D in Scipio, Utah
 K17NN-D in Leamington, Utah
 K17NP-D in Columbia, etc., Utah
 K17NQ-D in Orangeville, Utah, on virtual channel 5, which rebroadcasts KSL-TV
 K17NS-D in Chloride, Arizona
 K17NT-D in Ely & McGill, Nevada
 K17NU-D in Ruth, Nevada
 K17NV-D in Eureka, Nevada
 K17NX-D in Centralia/Chehalis, Washington, on virtual channel 13, which rebroadcasts KCPQ
 K17NY-D in Fruitland, Utah
 K17OA-D in Wray, Colorado, on virtual channel 47, which rebroadcasts K21NZ-D
 K17OB-D in Plevna, Montana
 K17OE-D in Colorado Springs, Colorado
 K17OK-D in Snowmass Village, Colorado
 K17OV-D in Duluth, Minnesota
 K17OW-D in Hobbs, New Mexico
 K17OY-D in Centerville, Washington
 K17PA-D in Mullan, Idaho
 K47OQ-D in Alexandria, Minnesota, on virtual channel 45, which rebroadcasts KSTC-TV
 KAAS-TV in Salina, Kansas
 KABH-CD in Bend, Oregon
 KACN-LP in Anchorage, Alaska
 KAJF-LD in Kansas City, Missouri, on virtual channel 21
 KAZQ in Albuquerque, New Mexico
 KBMY in Bismarck, North Dakota
 KBYU-TV in Provo, Utah, on virtual channel 11
 KCRP-CD in Corpus Christi, Texas
 KDIT-CD in Des Moines, Iowa
 KDIT-LD in Fort Dodge, Iowa
 KDSD-TV in Aberdeen, South Dakota
 KDTL-LD in St. Louis, Missouri
 KEEN-CD in Las Vegas, Nevada
 KIDU-LD in Brownwood, Texas
 KISU-TV in Pocatello, Idaho
 KIVY-LD in Crockett, Texas
 KJJC-TV in Great Falls, Montana
 KLBY in Colby, Kansas
 KLDF-CD in Lompoc, California
 KLTS-TV in Shreveport, Louisiana
 KLWB in New Iberia, Louisiana
 KMIZ in Columbia, Missouri
 KMOL-LD in Victoria, Texas
 KMTR in Eugene, Oregon
 KMWE-LD in Saint Cloud, Minnesota, on virtual channel 17
 KNCT in Belton, Texas
 KNSD in San Diego, California, on virtual channel 39
 KNVO in McAllen, Texas
 KODG-LD in Palm Springs, California
 KOOH-LD in Helena, Montana
 KPCB-DT in Snyder, Texas
 KPHO-TV in Phoenix, Arizona, on virtual channel 5
 KPJR-TV in Greeley, Colorado, on virtual channel 38
 KPTS in Wichita, Kansas
 KSBB-CD in Santa Barbara, California, an ATSC 3.0 station.
 KSNF in Joplin, Missouri
 KTEN in Ada, Oklahoma
 KTWO-TV in Casper, Wyoming
 KUAN-LD in Poway, etc., California, uses KNSD's spectrum, on virtual channel 48
 KUTU-CD in Tulsa, Oklahoma
 KVBI-CD in Clarkston, Washington
 KVIA-TV in El Paso, Texas
 KWQC-TV in Davenport, Iowa
 KWSU-TV in Spokane, Washington
 KYNE-TV in Omaha, Nebraska
 KYTL-LD in Twin Falls, Idaho
 W17CT-D in Manteo, North Carolina
 W17DL-D in Toa Baja, Puerto Rico, on virtual channel 17
 W17DO-D in Wilmington, North Carolina
 W17DZ-D in Sister Bay, Wisconsin
 W17EA-D in Arroyo, Puerto Rico
 W17EB-D in Columbus, Ohio, on virtual channel 44
 W17ED-D in Hornell/Alfred, New York
 W17EE-D in Lilesville/Wadesboro, North Carolina
 W17EH-D in Quincy, Illinois
 W17EI-D in Jackson, Tennessee
 W17ES-D in Adel, Georgia
 WAAY-TV in Huntsville, Alabama
 WALV-CD in Indianapolis, Indiana, on virtual channel 46
 WBEH-CD in Miami, Florida, on virtual channel 38
 WBME-CD in Milwaukee, Wisconsin, on virtual channel 41
 WBNX-TV in Akron, Ohio, on virtual channel 55
 WBZM-LD in Wilkes-Barre, Pennsylvania
 WCEE-LD in Charlotte, North Carolina
 WCET in Cincinnati, Ohio, on virtual channel 48
 WDTT-LD in Knoxville, Tennessee
 WEAR-TV in Pensacola, Florida
 WEAU in Eau Claire, Wisconsin
 WEIJ-LD in Fort Wayne, Indiana
 WEPH in Tupelo, Mississippi
 WEWA-LD in Wewahitchka, Florida
 WFFC-LD in Midland, Michigan
 WFTS-TV in Tampa, Florida, on virtual channel 28
 WFXU in Live Oak, Florida
 WGAT-LD in Augusta, Georgia
 WGBD-LD in Green Bay, Wisconsin
 WGBP-TV in Opelika, Alabama
 WHNS in Greenville, South Carolina
 WIRS in Yauco, Puerto Rico, uses WVEO's spectrum, on virtual channel 42
 WJMB-CD in Butler, Pennsylvania, on virtual channel 60, which rebroadcasts WOSC-CD
 WJMY-CD in Tuscaloosa, Alabama
 WJVF-LD in Jacksonville, Florida
 WKMU in Murray, Kentucky
 WKOH in Owensboro, Kentucky
 WKSO-TV in Somerset, Kentucky
 WKTD-CD in Portsmouth, Virginia
 WLCF-LD in Decatur, Illinois
 WLWC in New Bedford, Massachusetts, uses WPXQ-TV's spectrum
 WLIG-LD in Plainview, etc., New York
 WMLW-TV in Racine, Wisconsin, uses WBME-CD's spectrum, on virtual channel 49
 WMNN-LD in Lake City, Michigan
 WNMF-LD in Morristown, New Jersey, on virtual channel 17
 WOTV in Battle Creek, Michigan
 WPBI-LD in Lafayette, Indiana, on virtual channel 16
 WPFO in Waterville, Maine
 WPHL-TV in Philadelphia, Pennsylvania, on virtual channel 17
 WPXB-LD in Daytona Beach, Florida
 WPXQ-TV at Newport, Rhode Island
 WRAL-TV in Raleigh, North Carolina, on virtual channel 5
 WRTN-LD in Alexandria, Tennessee
 WSYR-TV in Syracuse, New York
 WTAT-TV in Charleston, South Carolina
 WTCN-CD in Palm Beach, Florida
 WTLW-LD in Lima, Ohio
 WUPL in Slidell, Louisiana
 WUVP-DT in Vineland, New Jersey, uses WPHL-TV's spectrum, on virtual channel 65
 WVBG-LD in Greenwich, New York
 WVEO in Aguadilla, Puerto Rico, on virtual channel 17
 WVXF in Charlotte Amalie, U.S. Virgin Islands
 WVVA in Bluefield, West Virginia
 WXMI in Battle Creek, Michigan
 WXVT-LD in Cleveland, Mississippi
 WYIN in Gary, Indiana, on virtual channel 56

The following stations, which are no longer licensed, formerly broadcast on digital channel 17 in the United States:
 K17AF-D in Delta Junction, Alaska
 K17CG-D in Ukiah, California
 K17GC-D in Pitkin, Colorado
 K17LB-D in Perryton, Texas
 K17LN-D in Gold Beach, Oregon
 K17LX-D in Bakersfield, California
 K17OD-D in Silver City, New Mexico
 K41JT-D in Kilauea Military Camp, Hawaii
 KGLU-LD in Ottumwa, Iowa
 KHJL-LD in Rapid City, South Dakota
 KJRW in Eureka, California
 W17EQ-D in Byromville, Georgia
 WDYI-LD in Macon, Georgia
 WNDC-LD in Salisbury, Maryland
 WPGF-LD in Memphis, Tennessee

References

17 digital